Liza Mundy (born 8 July 1960) is an American journalist, non-fiction writer, and fellow at New America Foundation. She has written a number of books and her writings have also appeared in The Atlantic, Politico, The New York Times, The New Republic, Slate, The Guardian, and The Washington Post. She is married to mechanical engineer, science communicator, and television presenter Bill Nye.

Books

Code Girls
Code Girls: The Untold Story of the American Women Code Breakers of World War II documents the work of thousands of female American codebreakers during World War II, including top analysts such as Elizebeth Friedman and Agnes Driscoll, lesser known but outstanding contributors like Genevieve Grotjan Feinstein and Ann Zeilinger Caracristi, and many others. It received positive reviews in The New York Times, The Washington Post, and The Christian Science Monitor, though the Monitor also states that "Mundy doesn't entirely succeed in deciphering the extraordinary complexity of codes and cryptography for layperson readers. It can be hard to understand exactly how codes were created and cracked." Smithsonian ranked it one of the ten best science books of 2017.

References

External links
 

21st-century American non-fiction writers
Living people
American women non-fiction writers
21st-century American women writers
21st-century American journalists
American women journalists
American historians of espionage
1960 births